Oshawa is a provincial electoral district in Ontario, Canada, that has been represented in the Legislative Assembly of Ontario since 1955.

History
In 2015 the provincial districts were updated, and Oshawa gained parts of the city which were previously part of the electoral district of Whitby-Oshawa. The 2018 provincial election was the first in which the new borders were used. The new borders include most of the actual city of Oshawa, although it excludes the mostly rural areas from Wards 4, 6, and 7 north of Taunton Road. These northern parts are part of the Durham electoral district.

Previously the district of Oshawa consisted of the southern and eastern parts of the City of Oshawa south and east of a line drawn from west to east along King Street West, north along Oshawa Creek, east along Rossland Road West, north along Simcoe Street North and east along Winchester Road East.  The riding includes the communities of Kedron and Taunton and the eastern part of North Oshawa. In 1999, provincial ridings were defined to have the same borders as federal ridings. The federal district was also re-mapped to include the north-western sections.

Demographics
2017 estimates; figures derived from Canada 2016 Census:
Population: 167,965 (159,458 in 2016 census) 
Average individual income: $46,627 
Median individual income: $36,268
Average household income: $89,788
Median household income: $71,225  
With Canadian citizenship: 163,768  (97.6%)
With citizenship other than Canadian: 4,196 (2.4%)
Immigrated between 2000-2005: 2,297 
Immigrated between 2006-2011: 1,671 
Immigrated after 2012: 1,765 
Born in province of residence: 125,439 
Born outside province of residence: 16,417 
English only: 156,167 (92.9%)
English and French: 10,775 (6.4%)
French only: 188 
Neither English nor French: 834

Members of Provincial Parliament

Election results

2007 electoral reform referendum

References

Elections Ontario Past Election Results
Map of riding for 2018 election

Ontario provincial electoral districts
Politics of Oshawa